The Templo de San Francisco [English:  Church(or Temple) of St Francis]  is one of the main Catholic churches in the city of Chihuahua, Chihuahua, Mexico. It is now recognized as one of the most valuable buildings in the city as one of the few still-existing colonial monuments in the city centre. It is located at 15 Calle Libertad.

Even though it is named for St Francis of Assisi (because a previous name of the city of Chihuahua was San Francisco El Cuellar and because it was built and occupied first by the Franciscans), it is now maintained and supported by the Dominicans. Its architecture is typical of Franciscan missions, very simple and serene, and always painted in tones of white in accordance with the Franciscan policy of austerity.

History
This building was one of the first churches built in Chihuahua City. Construction began in 1717 on a plan that called for a latin cross with a dome over the crossing (the sanctuary is essentially unchanged since completion in 1789);  it also served as the first junior school for ladies in Chihuahua. In 1811 the beheaded body of Fr Miguel Hidalgo y Costilla, considered the 'Father of the Nation', was intombed in the West Chapel of the temple after his execution by the Spanish; after the independence of Mexico, it was taken to Mexico City. A marker commemorates the original burial site.

In 2004 the Church of San Francisco was first illuminated for the celebrations of the independence of Mexico, September 16, and remains an active Catholic parish.

Interior

See also

References

18th-century Roman Catholic church buildings in Mexico
Chihuahua City
Buildings and structures in Chihuahua (state)
Landmarks in Chihuahua (state)
National Monuments of Mexico
Roman Catholic churches completed in 1789
1789 establishments in New Spain
18th-century architecture in Mexico
Spanish Colonial architecture in Mexico
Church buildings with domes
Tourist attractions in Chihuahua (state)